Kathryn Ann Fleming (October 6, 1965 – December 14, 2006) was an American actress, artist, singer, and award-winning audiobook narrator and producer. She was the owner and executive producer at Cedar House Audio, an audio production company specializing in spoken word that is located in Seattle, Washington, United States.

Biography 
Fleming was born in Arlington, Virginia in 1965. She grew up in the Washington, D.C. area and graduated from the College of William and Mary in 1987 (Bachelor of Arts, Religion). Fleming studied at the Actors Theatre of Louisville, Kentucky, and was an alumna of the 1987/1988 Apprentice Company.

After a stint as a professional actor, she branched into audiobooks in the mid-1990s. Fleming recorded well over 200 titles, many under the stage name Anna Fields.

In 2004, Fleming won the Audie Award for Unabridged Fiction for her performance of Ruth Ozeki's All Over Creation. In a July 1, 2005, interview with the William & Mary Alumni Association, Fleming noted several of her favorite narration projects: Bel Canto by Ann Patchett,  The Falls by Joyce Carol Oates, Baker Towers by Jennifer Haigh, and "any title" by Louise Erdrich. In addition to her work on audiobooks, she also narrated the Military Channel's six-episode series Navy Seals, which chronicled the six-month basic training process for US Navy Seals in 2007. Another military-themed narration was for the Discovery Channel documentary Secrets of the Stealth: Nighthawk, on the F-117 Nighthawk, the US Air Force's first stealth plane, and its crucial role in winning the first Gulf War.

Fleming died when a flash flood trapped her inside her Madison Valley basement studio during the Hanukkah Eve wind storm of 2006. She is survived by her wife and partner of nine years, Charlene Strong. At the hospital, Strong was denied access to see Fleming until permission was granted by an out-of-state relative. The experience led Strong to advocate for legislation that was eventually passed as Washington's Domestic Partnership Law.

After Fleming's death, the City of Seattle commissioned a report to determine the cause of flash flooding in Fleming's neighborhood. As of 2013, the house where Fleming died had been replaced by a garden, and the city has completed a stormwater project in the neighborhood. The project features a reservoir capable of holding excess storm runoff when the rest of the system is over capacity. A memorial at the site is inscribed with words that Fleming would say before going on stage as an actress: "Be a light. Be a flame. Be a beacon."

Filmography

Film

References

External links

Cedar House Audio
AudioFile magazine Golden Voices profile
Obituary on AfterEllen.com
Book World Loses Narrator Kate Fleming December 19, 2006, on National Public Radio; Two minutes and 52 seconds. (Windows Media Player, RealPlayer).
Add your voice to the chorus calling for equality and dignity , Guest column by Charlene Strong, Seattle Times, August 9, 2007.
In tragedy's wake, an unlikely activist is born , Seattle Gay News, November 16, 2007.

1965 births
2006 deaths
Actresses from Seattle
Actresses from Washington, D.C.
American voice actresses
Audiobook narrators
College of William & Mary alumni
Deaths by drowning in the United States
Deaths in floods
American lesbian actresses
LGBT people from Virginia
LGBT people from Washington (state)
Natural disaster deaths in Washington (state)